Brightwell is an English surname derived from Brightwell or a similar toponym. Notable people of the name include the following:

Emily Brightwell (born 1948), American writer
Gary Brightwell (born 1999), American football player
Robbie Brightwell (born 1939), British athlete
Thomas Brightwell, English academic administrator

English toponymic surnames